Annemarie Ebner is an Austrian luger who competed in the 1970s. A natural track luger, she won three medals in the women's singles event at the FIL European Luge Natural Track Championships with two silvers (1971, 1975) and one bronze (1974).

References

External links
Natural track European Championships results 1970-2006.

Austrian female lugers
Possibly living people
Year of birth missing
20th-century Austrian women